The Hum is a name often given to widespread reports of a persistent and invasive low-frequency humming, rumbling, or droning noise audible to many but not all people. Hums have been reported all over the world, including the United States, the United Kingdom, Australia and Canada. They are sometimes named according to the locality where the problem has been particularly publicized, such as the "Taos Hum" in New Mexico and the "Windsor Hum" in Ontario.

The Hum does not appear to be a single phenomenon. Different causes have been attributed, including local mechanical sources, often from industrial plants, as well as manifestations of tinnitus or other biological auditory effects.

Description
A 1973 report cites a university study of fifty cases of people complaining about a "low throbbing background noise" that others were unable to hear. The sound, always peaking between 30 and 40 Hz, was found to only be heard during cool weather with a light breeze, and often early in the morning.

Taos Hum
A study into the Taos Hum in the early 1990s indicated that at least two percent could hear it; each hearer at a different frequency between 32 Hz and 80 Hz, modulated from 0.5 to 2 Hz. Similar results have been found in an earlier British study. There are approximately equal percentages of male and female hearers. Age does appear to be a factor, with middle-aged people more likely to hear it.

Auckland Hum
In 2006, Tom Moir, then of Massey University in Auckland, New Zealand, made several recordings that appeared to be the Auckland Hum. His previous research using simulated sounds had indicated that the hum was around 56 hertz.

Windsor Hum
In late 2011, residents of Windsor, Ontario (south of Detroit, Michigan), began reporting a low droning vibration, sometimes loud enough to be irritating (one evening in 2012 saw 22,000 reports to officials). It was estimated that the sound was emanating from Zug Island, a heavily industrialized section of River Rouge on the north bank of the Detroit River (which separates Windsor and Detroit). Canadian officials requested US assistance in determining the source, but local authorities were stymied by official refusals to allow access to the island. A steel mill operated by U.S. Steel was the possible cause, but officials stated that no new equipment had been installed or activated around the time that the noise became noticeable. However, when the blast furnaces were deactivated in April 2020, the noise went away as well.

Other

In 2021, hums were reported in Frankfurt and Darmstadt, in Germany. 

In 2022, hums were reported in St. Louis County, Missouri and surrounding areas.

Possible explanations
There is skepticism as to whether the hum exists as a physical sound. In 2009, the head of audiology at Addenbrooke's Hospital in Cambridge, David Baguley, said he believed people's problems with the hum were based on the physical world about one-third of the time, and stemmed from people focusing too keenly on innocuous background sounds the other two-thirds of the time. His research focuses on using psychology and relaxation techniques to minimise distress, which can lead to a quieting or even removal of the noise.

Geoff Leventhall, a noise and vibration expert, has suggested cognitive behavioral therapy (CBT) may be effective in helping those affected, saying that "It's a question of whether you tense up to the noise or are relaxed about it. The CBT was shown to work, by helping people to take a different attitude to it."

Mechanical devices
Although an obvious candidate, given the common description of the hum as sounding like a diesel engine, the majority of reported hums have not been traced to a specific mechanical source.

In the case of Kokomo, Indiana, a city with heavy industry, the origin of the hum was thought to have been traced to two sources. The first was a 36-hertz tone from a cooling tower at the local DaimlerChrysler casting plant and the second was a 10-hertz tone from an air compressor intake at the Haynes International plant. After those devices were corrected, however, reports of the hum persisted.

Three hums have been linked to mechanical sources. The West Seattle Hum was traced to a vacuum pump used by CalPortland to offload cargo from ships. After CalPortland replaced the silencers on the machine, reports of the hum ceased. Likewise, the Wellington Hum is thought to have been due to the diesel generator on a visiting ship. A 35 Hz hum in Windsor, Ontario, is thought to have originated from a steelworks on the industrial zone of Zug Island near Detroit, with reports of the noise ceasing after the U.S. Steel plant there ceased operations in April 2020.

One hum in Myrtle Beach, South Carolina, was suspected of originating at a Santee Cooper substation almost 2 miles away from the home of a couple who first reported it. The substation is home to the state's largest transformer. One local couple sued the power company for the disruption the hum was causing them. The hum was louder inside their house than out, in part, they believed, because their house vibrated in resonance to the 60 Hz hum. In the lawsuit it is claimed that the volume of the hum was measured at up to 64.1 dB in the couple's home.

Some researchers speculate that the very low frequency radio waves or extremely low frequency radio waves of the military TACAMO system, used by aircraft to communicate with submarines, might be the source for the hum. David Deming observes that the difficulty of locating a source of the hum could be attributed to its broadcast from moving aircraft in this fashion, although he notes that there have never been any reports of the Hum around the US Navy's stationary broadcast stations at Cutler, Maine, and Jim Creek, Washington.

Deming considers it significant that the Hum "avoids publicity", often subsiding in response to an increase in local press coverage, and speculates that this may be a sign that the source is anthropogenic in nature.

Tinnitus
A suggested diagnosis of tinnitus, a self-reported disturbance of the auditory system, is used by some physicians in response to complaints about the Hum. Tinnitus is generated internally by the auditory and nervous systems, with no external stimulus.

While the Hum is hypothesized by some to be a form of low frequency tinnitus such as the venous hum, some report it is not internal, being worse inside their homes than outside. However, others insist that it is equally bad indoors and outdoors. Some people notice the Hum only at home, while others hear it everywhere they go. Some sufferers report that it is made worse by soundproofing (e.g., double glazing), which serves only to decrease other environmental noise, thus making the Hum more apparent.

Spontaneous otoacoustic emissions
Human ears generate their own noises, called spontaneous otoacoustic emissions (SOAE). Various studies have shown that 38–60% of adults with normal hearing have them, although the majority are unaware of these sounds. The people who do hear these sounds typically hear a faint hissing (cicada-like sound), buzzing or ringing, especially if they are otherwise in complete silence.

Researchers who looked at the Taos Hum considered otoacoustic emissions as a possibility.

Jet stream
Philip Dickinson suggested at an Institute of Biology conference in 1973 that the 30–40 Hz hum could be a result of the jet stream shearing against slower-moving air and possibly being amplified by powerline posts, some of which were shown to vibrate, or by rooms which had a corresponding resonant frequency. Geoff Leventhall of the Chelsea College Acoustics Group dismissed this suggestion as "absolute nonsense".

Animals

One of the many possible causes of the West Seattle Hum considered was that it was related to the midshipman fish, also known as a toadfish. A previous hum in Sausalito, California, also on the west coast of the United States, was determined to be the mating call of the male midshipman. However, in that case the hum was resonating through houseboat hulls and affecting the people living on those boats. In the West Seattle case, the University of Washington researcher determined that it would be impossible for any resonating hum, transmitted via tanker or boat hulls, to be transmitted very far inland, certainly not far enough to account for the reports.

The Scottish Association for Marine Science hypothesised that the nocturnal humming sound heard in Hythe, Hampshire, in the UK could be produced by a similar "sonic" fish. The council believed this to be unlikely, since such fish are not commonly found in inshore waters of the UK.

As of February 2014, although the source had still not been located, the sound had by then at least been recorded.

In popular culture
The Taos Hum has been featured on the TV show Unsolved Mysteries, and in LiveSciences "Top Ten Unexplained Phenomena", where it took tenth place. British station BBC Radio 4 featured an investigation of the Hum phenomena in their Punt PI fact-based comedy programme. In October 2022, the Norwegian state broadcaster NRK covered the Hum in its Oppdatert podcast.

In a 1998 episode of The X-Files titled "Drive", Agent Mulder speculates that extremely low frequency (ELF) radio waves "may be behind the so-called Taos Hum".

In a 2018 episode of the police procedural series Criminal Minds, characters are made to commit violent acts as a result of mania caused by the Hum. The story editors described the episode as having "an X-Files feel".

See also
 Exploding head syndrome
 Infrasound
 List of unexplained sounds
 Skyquake

References

Further reading
 Deming, D. (2004). The Hum:  An Anomalous Sound Heard Throughout the World
 
 
  Archive 2.

External links
 The World Hum Map and Database

Earth mysteries
Fringe science
New Mexico culture
Noise pollution
Unidentified sounds